Following is a list of movie misquotes, ordered by release date.
Quotes may be changed for a number of reasons. Long ones, such as Apocalypse Now "I love the smell of napalm ..." or Gold Hat's rant about badges in The Treasure of the Sierra Madre, may be shortened. Sometimes misquotes improve the "rhythm or cadence" of the original; for example, Mae West's "Why don't you come up sometime and see me?" becomes "Why don't you come up and see me sometime?"

References

See also
 AFI's 100 Years...100 Movie Quotes

Misquotes
 Misquotes